Thursday is the day of the week between Wednesday and Friday. According to the ISO 8601 international standard, it is the fourth day of the week. In countries which adopt the "Sunday-first" convention, it is the fifth day of the week.

Name
See Names of the days of the week for more on naming conventions.

Thor's day

The name is derived from Old English þunresdæg and Middle English Thuresday (with loss of -n-, first in northern dialects, from influence of Old Norse Þórsdagr) meaning "Thor's Day". It was named after the Norse god of Thunder, Thor. Thunor, Donar (German, Donnerstag) and Thor are derived from the name of the Germanic god of thunder, Thunraz, equivalent to Jupiter in the interpretatio romana.

In most Romance languages, the day is named after the Roman god Jupiter, who was the god of sky and thunder.  In Latin, the day was known as Iovis Dies, "Jupiter's Day".  In Latin, the genitive or possessive case of Jupiter was Iovis/Jovis and thus in most Romance languages it became the word for Thursday: Italian giovedì, Spanish jueves, French jeudi, Sardinian jòvia, Catalan dijous, Galician xoves and Romanian joi. This is also reflected in the p-Celtic Welsh dydd Iau.

The astrological and astronomical sign of the planet Jupiter (♃ ) is sometimes used to represent Thursday.

Since the Roman god Jupiter was identified with Thunor (Norse Thor in northern Europe), most Germanic languages name the day after this god: Torsdag in Danish, Norwegian, and Swedish, Hósdagur/Tórsdagur in Faroese, Donnerstag in German  or Donderdag in Dutch. Finnish and Northern Sami, both non-Germanic (Uralic) languages, uses the borrowing "Torstai" and "Duorastat". In the extinct Polabian Slavic language, it was perundan, Perun being the Slavic equivalent of Thor.

Vishnu's/Buddha's/Dattatrey's Day
There are a number of modern names imitating the naming of Thursday after an equivalent of "Jupiter" in local tradition. 
In most of the languages of India, the word for Thursday is Guruvāra – vāra meaning day and Guru being the style for Bṛhaspati, guru to the gods and regent of the planet Jupiter. This day marks the worship of Lord Vishnu/Lord Buddha and Lord Dattatreya in Hinduism. In Sanskrit language, the day is called Bṛhaspativāsaram (day of Bṛhaspati). In Nepali language, the day is called Bihivāra as derived from the Sanskrit word same like in Hindi vara means day and Bihivāra meaning Bṛhaspati. In Thai, the word is Wan Pharuehatsabodi, also in Old Javanese as Respati or in Balinese as Wraspati – referring to the Hindu deity Bṛhaspati, also associated with Jupiter.
En was an old Illyrian deity and in his honor in the Albanian language Thursday is called "Enjte". 
In the Nahuatl language, Thursday is  meaning "day of Tezcatlipoca".

Fourth day

In Slavic languages and in Chinese, this day's name is "fourth" (Slovak štvrtok, Czech čtvrtek, Slovene četrtek, Polish czwartek, Russian четверг chetverg, Bulgarian четвъртък, Serbo-Croatian четвртак / četvrtak, Macedonian четврток, Ukrainian четвер chetver). Hungarian uses a Slavic loanword "csütörtök". In Chinese, it is  xīngqīsì ("fourth solar day"). In Estonian it's neljapäev, meaning "fourth day" or "fourth day in a week". The Baltic languages also use the term "fourth day" (Latvian ceturtdiena, Lithuanian ketvirtadienis).

Fifth day

Greek uses a number for this day:  Πέμπτη Pémpti "fifth," as does  "fifth day," Hebrew:  (Yom Khamishi – day fifth) often written  ("Yom Hey" – 5th letter Hey day), and Arabic:  ("Yaum al-Khamīs" – fifth day). Rooted from Arabic, the Indonesian word for Thursday is "Kamis", similarly "Khamis" in Malaysian and "Kemis" in Javanese.

In Catholic liturgy, Thursday is referred to in Latin as feria quinta. Portuguese, unlike other Romance languages, uses the word quinta-feira, meaning "fifth day of liturgical celebration", that comes from the Latin feria quinta used in religious texts where it was not allowed to consecrate days to pagan gods.

Icelandic also uses the term fifth day (Fimmtudagur).

In the Persian language, Thursday is referred to as panj-shanbeh, meaning 5th day of the week.

Quakers traditionally referred to Thursday as "Fifth Day" eschewing the pagan origin of the English name "Thursday".

Cultural and religious practices

Christian holidays
In the Christian tradition, Maundy Thursday or Holy Thursday is the Thursday before Easter — the day on which the Last Supper occurred.  Also known as Sheer Thursday in the United Kingdom, it is traditionally a day of cleaning and giving out Maundy money there.  Holy Thursday is part of Holy Week.

In the Eastern Orthodox Church. Thursdays are dedicated to the Apostles and Saint Nicholas. The Octoechos contains hymns on these themes, arranged in an eight-week cycle, that are chanted on Thursdays throughout the year.  At the end of Divine Services on Thursday, the dismissal begins with the words: "May Christ our True God, through the intercessions of his most-pure Mother, of the holy, glorious and all-laudable Apostles, of our Father among the saints Nicholas, Archbishop of Myra in Lycia, the Wonder-worker…"

Ascension Thursday is 40 days after Easter, when Christ ascended into Heaven.

Islam
In Islam, Thursdays are one of the days in a week in which Muslims are encouraged to do voluntary fasting, the other being Mondays.

Judaism

In Judaism, Thursdays are considered auspicious days for fasting.  The Didache warned early Christians not to fast on Thursdays to avoid Judaizing, and suggested Fridays instead.

In Judaism the Torah is read in public on Thursday mornings, and special penitential prayers are said on Thursday, unless there is a special occasion for happiness which cancels them.

Druze faith

Formal Druze worship is confined to weekly meeting on Thursday evenings, during which all members of community gather together to discuss local issues before those not initiated into the secrets of the faith (the juhhāl, or the ignorant) are dismissed, and those who are "uqqāl" or "enlightened" (those few initiated in the Druze holy books) remain to read and study their holy scriptures.

Practices in countries

In Buddhist Thailand Thursday is considered the "Teacher's Day", and it is believed that one should begin one's education on this auspicious day. Thai students still pay homages to their teachers in specific ceremony always held on a selected Thursday. And graduation day in Thai universities, which can vary depending on each university, almost always will be held on a Thursday.

In the Thai solar calendar, the colour associated with Thursday is orange.

In the United States, Thanksgiving Day is an annual festival celebrated on the fourth Thursday in November.

In Finland and Sweden, pea soup is traditionally served on Thursdays.

Conventional weekly events
In Australia, most cinema movies premieres are held on Thursdays. Also, most Australians are paid on a Thursday, either weekly or fortnightly. Shopping malls see this as an opportunity to open longer than usual, generally until 9 pm, as most pay cheques are cleared by Thursday morning.

In Norway, Thursday has also traditionally been the day when most shops and malls are open later than on the other weekdays, although the majority of shopping malls now are open until 8 pm or 9 pm every weekday.

In the USSR of the 1970s and 1980s Thursday was the "Fish Day" (Rybny den), when the nation's foodservice establishments were supposed to serve fish (rather than meat) dishes.

For college and university students, Thursday is sometimes referred to as the new Friday. There are often fewer or sometimes no classes on Fridays and more opportunities to hold parties on Thursday night and sleep in on Friday. As a consequence, some call Thursday "thirstday" or "thirsty Thursday".

Elections in the United Kingdom
In the United Kingdom, all general elections since 1935 have been held on a Thursday, and this has become a tradition, although not a requirement of the law — which merely states that an election may be held on any day "except Saturdays, Sundays, Christmas Eve, Christmas Day, Good Friday, bank holidays in any part of the United Kingdom and any day appointed for public thanksgiving and mourning".

Additionally, local elections are usually held on the first Thursday in May.

The Electoral Administration Act 2006 removed Maundy Thursday as an excluded day on the electoral timetable, therefore an election can now be held on Maundy Thursday; prior to this elections were sometimes scheduled on the Tuesday before as an alternative.

Astrology
Thursday is aligned by the planet Jupiter and the astrological signs of Pisces and Sagittarius.

Popular culture
In the nursery rhyme, "Monday's Child", "Thursday's Child has far to go".
In some high schools in the United States during the 1950s and the 1960s, rumours said that if someone wore green on Thursdays, it meant that he or she was gay or lesbian.
Thursday is the day of the Second Round draw in the English League Cup.
Super Thursday is an annual promotional event in the publishing industry as well as an important day in UK elections (see above).

Literature
Gabriel Syme, the main character, was given the title of Thursday in G. K. Chesterton's novel The Man Who Was Thursday (1908).
The titular day in Sweet Thursday (1954) (the sequel to John Steinbeck's novel Cannery Row (1945)), the author explains, is the day after Lousy Wednesday and the day before Waiting Friday.
In The Hitchhiker's Guide to the Galaxy by Douglas Adams, the character Arthur Dent says: "This must be Thursday. I never could get the hang of Thursdays". A few minutes later the planet Earth is destroyed. In another Douglas Adams book, The Long Dark Tea-time of the Soul (1988), one of the characters says to the character Thor, after whom the day was named: "I'm not used to spending the evening with someone who's got a whole day named after them".
In the cross media work Thursday's Fictions by Richard James Allen and Karen Pearlman, Thursday is the title character, a woman who tries to cheat the cycle of reincarnation to get a form of eternal life.  Thursday's Fictions has been a stage production, a book, a film and an 3D online immersive world in Second Life.
Thursday Next is the central character in a series of novels by Jasper Fforde.
In Garth Nix's popular The Keys to the Kingdom series, Thursday is an antagonist, a violent general who is a personification of the actual day and the Sin of Wrath.
According to Nostradamus' prediction (Century 1, Quatrain 50), a powerful (but otherwise unidentified) leader who will threaten "the East" will be born of three water signs and takes Thursday as his feast day.

Cinema
Thursday (1998 film) is a movie starring Thomas Jane, about the day of a drug dealer gone straight, who gets pulled back into his old lifestyle.
The Thursday (1963), is an Italian film.

Music

Thursday Afternoon is a 1985 album by the British ambient musician Brian Eno consisting of one 60-minute-long composition. It is the rearranged soundtrack to a video production of the same title made in 1984.
Donnerstag aus Licht (Thursday from Light) is an opera by Karlheinz Stockhausen.
Thursday is a post-hardcore band from New Brunswick, New Jersey, formed in 1997.
"Thursday's Child" is a David Bowie song from the album hours...(1999).
"Thursday's Child" is a song by The Chameleons on Script of the Bridge (1983).
"Outlook for Thursday" was a hit in New Zealand for Dave Dobbyn.
Thursday (mixtape)" is the name of a mixtape by R&B artist The Weeknd released in 2011.

References

 
4 Thursday
Thor